Henry Turner may refer to:

Politics
 Henry E. Turner (New York politician) (1832–1911), American politician, New York
 Henry Gray Turner (1839–1904), American politician, Georgia
 Henry E. Turner (Massachusetts politician) (1842–1911), American politician, Massachusetts
 Henry Turner (Queensland politician) (1844–1932)
 Harry Turner (Australian politician) (Henry Basil Turner, 1905–1988)
 Lawrence Turner (1908-1977), full name Henry Frederic Lawrence Turner, British politician

Other
 Hugh Turner (theologian) (Henry Ernest William Turner, 1907–1995), British theologian
 Henry Gyles Turner (1831–1920), Australian banker and historian
 Henry McNeal Turner (1833–1915), Bishop of the African Methodist Episcopal Church
 Henry Turner (endocrinologist) (1892–1970), first described Turner syndrome
 Henry Turner (baseball) (James Henry Turner, 1913-2000), American baseball player
 Henry Ashby Turner (1932–2008), American historian of Germany
 Henry Turner (basketball) (born 1966), American basketball player
 Henry E. Turner (Rhode Island physician) (1816–1897), physician and horticulturalist

Fictional people
 Henry Turner, title character played by Harrison Ford in the film Regarding Henry
 Henry Turner (Pirates of the Caribbean)

See also
 Harry Turner (disambiguation)